Basilio Álvez (born 11 July 1915, date of death unknown) was a Uruguayan boxer. He competed in the men's featherweight event at the 1948 Summer Olympics.

References

External links
 

1915 births
Year of death missing
Uruguayan male boxers
Olympic boxers of Uruguay
Boxers at the 1948 Summer Olympics
People from Tacuarembó
Featherweight boxers